Mohammadabad-e Pain or Mohammadabad Pain may refer to:

 Mohammadabad-e Pain, Fars
 Mohammadabad-e Pain, Golestan
 Mohammadabad-e Pain, alternate name of Mohammadabad-e Sofla, Kerman, Kerman Province
 Mohammadabad-e Pain, alternate name of Mohammadabad-e Anbari, Kerman Province
 Mohammadabad-e Pain, Sistan and Baluchestan
 Mohammadabad-e Pain, South Khorasan